The Škoda Kodiaq is a mid-size crossover SUV with three-row seating manufactured by the Czech automaker Škoda Auto since 2016. The vehicle sits in Škoda's D-SUV, above the Kamiq and Karoq. The vehicle is based on the Volkswagen Group MQB platform closely shared with the similarly-sized Volkswagen Tiguan Allspace and the SEAT Tarraco.

Overview
The car was previously previewed as concept car named Škoda Vision S in Geneva Motor Show 2016. 

In December 2015, Škoda registered the name "Kodiaq". The name refers to the largest brown bear, the Kodiak bear, living on the island of the same name off the south coast of Alaska. As part of its marketing campaign, the Kodiak town in Kodiak Island, Alaska was renamed Kodiaq for one day.

In February 2016, images of the Vision S concept were released, and the concept model appeared in March 2016 at the Geneva Motor Show. The final SUV was introduced at the Paris Motor Show on 29 September 2016. The first cars were officially delivered to customers in February 2017.

The Kodiaq is the first vehicle in the Škoda lineup to have Area View, Tow Assist, Manoeuvre Assist and Predictive Pedestrian Protection. It is also the first vehicle in the Volkswagen Group MQB platform lineup to feature capacitive shortcut buttons instead of physical buttons for the 8" infotainment systems.

Facelift
In April 2021, Škoda launched a lightly facelifted version of the Kodiaq. Subtle cosmetic changes were introduced, including a redesigned hood and a more upright front grille, with slimmer front headlights that employ matrix LED technology as optional equipment. The changes made serve a functional purpose in making the Kodiaq more aerodynamic than before, by tweaking the bumpers and installing a new roof-mounted spoiler. The facelifted Kodiaq can be had with a choice of 17- to 20-inch wheels and some variants have been updated for the sake of reducing drag, while the high-performance Kodiaq RS rides on a new set of 20-inch polished wheels finished in metallic black and equipped with aero plastic shields. The biTDI version was discontinued on the RS and replaced by the 2.0 TSI  engine that was also found in Tiguan.

Scout, Sportline, RS and GT
The new Kodiaq Scout and Kodiaq Sportline were introduced at the Geneva Motor Show in March 2017. These changes include front and rear underbody protection with bumper trim, silver mirror caps, and badging on the front wing and the glove compartment. The Scout comes in all-wheel drive with one turbo petrol TSI engines and two turbo diesel TDI engines. Kodiaq Sportline brings new styling tweaks, some parts are made in black, sports seats, steering wheel in leather, big alloy wheels and pedals made from aluminium.

The Kodiaq RS (vRS in the United Kingdom) was introduced at the Paris Motor Show in October 2018. It is at the top of the range, the fastest Kodiaq and the most expensive Škoda available. The Kodiaq RS has got a more aggressive design, from leather and carbon leather are made the sports upholstered seats, steering wheel, the door threshold and the entrance rails of the doors. It comes with Virtual Cockpit, a gloss black grille, 20" alloy wheels Xtreme, 17-inch red painted brake calipers, different front and rear bumper designs, heated front sports seats and full LED headlights. It holds the track record at the Nürburgring for any seven seat SUV. Since 2019, the British Police have used Škoda Kodiaq vRS as police cars. 

The Kodiaq GT is the coupé version of the Kodiaq for the Chinese market. It was introduced at the Guangzhou Motor Show on 16 November 2018. It is sold only in China, and is available with two 2.0-litre petrol engines (137 kW and 162 kW).

Engines
The Škoda Kodiaq is available with a range of turbocharged petrol and diesel engines, ranging from 1.4 to 2.0 litres, and a choice of front or all wheel drive.

Second generation (2023) 
The second generation Kodiaq is expected to debut before the end of 2023.

On 17 March 2023, Škoda confirmed that a new generation Kodiaq will debut for the second half of 2023.

Awards 
In November 2016, the Škoda Kodiaq was named the "Best Family Car in the World" by Top Gear Magazine. Kodiaq won the title of the "Car of the Year" 2017 in the Czech Republic, Poland and Bulgaria, the SUV of the Year in China and France, and the all wheel drive car in Germany.

The Kodiaq also won in German magazine competition Auto Test for 2017, and is the winner of competitions in British magazines Auto Express and What Car? for 2017. The Kodiaq also received the Red Dot Design Award for 2017.

Sales

References

External links

Official website 

2010s cars
All-wheel-drive vehicles
Cars introduced in 2016
Crossover sport utility vehicles
Front-wheel-drive vehicles
Mid-size sport utility vehicles
Euro NCAP large off-road
Kodiaq